East Asia–United States relations covers American relations with the region as a whole, as well as summaries of relations with China, Japan, Korea, Taiwan and smaller places. It includes diplomatic, military, economic, social and cultural ties. The emphasis is on historical developments.

Main countries

History

Southeast Asia
Early American entry into what was then called the East Indies was low key. In 1795, a secret voyage for pepper set sail from Salem, Massachusetts on an 18-month voyage that returned with a bulk cargo of pepper, the first to be so imported into the country, which sold at a profit of seven hundred per cent. In 1831, the merchantman Friendship of Salem returned to report the ship had been plundered, and the first officer and two crewmen murdered in Sumatra. The Anglo-Dutch Treaty of 1824 obligated the Dutch to ensure the safety of shipping and overland trade in and around Aceh, and they accordingly sent the Royal Netherlands East Indies Army on the punitive expedition of 1831. President Andrew Jackson also ordered America's first Sumatran punitive expedition of 1832, which was followed by a second punitive expedition in 1838. The Friendship incident thus afforded the Dutch a reason to take over Aceh; and Jackson, to dispatch diplomatist Edmund Roberts, who in 1833 secured the Roberts Treaty with Siam. In 1856, negotiations for amendment of this treaty, Townsend Harris stated the position of the United States:The United States does not hold any possessions in the East, nor does it desire any. The form of government forbids the holding of colonies. The United States therefore cannot be an object of jealousy to any Eastern Power. Peaceful commercial relations, which give as well as receive benefits, is what the President wishes to establish with Siam, and such is the object of my mission.

Opium trade in China
British merchants, protected by the Royal Navy, dominated the opium trade in China. The opium was grown in India – then under British control – and sold by British merchants to Chinese wholesalers in China. The Chinese government protested, two wars resulted, with decisive victories by the British. The Americans did only 1/10 as much opium business in China, but showed more ingenuity in developing sources, and building a network of Chinese merchants. The British had a monopoly on the Indian supply, but the Americans relied more on Turkey, and circumvented Chinese restrictions by smuggling to local merchants in the Portuguese colony of Macau while the Chinese government was focused exclusively on the British in Canton. In effect the British Navy protected the American interests, and American merchants received protection from the unequal treaties that China was forced to sign with the British. American merchant Peter Snow was based in Canton, but his business was not highly profitable. On the other hand, he served as the U.S. consul there in the late 1830s and early 1840s. He proved efficient and effective in protecting American business interests during the opium crisis of 1839–40. The Chinese government saw him the Americans as a counterweight to the British. The Americans opportunistically took advantage of British victories and gain the same privileges without using or threatening to use its military. The emerging American policy was equal opportunity for all nations, which by 1900 became the "open door" policy. The main American activity in China saw merchants unloaded their opium in Portuguese Macau, and purchase tea, silk and China in Canton. Most of the Americans were based in Salem Massachusetts, and after 1840 they suddenly gave up the international trade, and invested their profits in new textile factories in New England. There were practically no opportunities to invest in China itself, so the American presence dropped off sharply. All the remained was a nostalgic image of a friendly China that probably encouraged missionary activities in the late 1840s.

Extraterritorial rights 
Under the 1844 Treaty of Wanghia, negotiated by U.S. minister Caleb Cushing, American businessmen were restricted to the designated international districts in designated port cities. They were exempt from Chinese courts and were instead under the legal jurisdiction of American officials. These extraterritorial rights lasted until 1943. The treaty represented an American challenge to British dominance. China mades similar treaties with Japan and the Western powers in order to block a British takeover of the Chinese market. American missionaries were allowed anywhere.

Better travel opportunities
The opportunities for fast steamship travel from San Francisco improve dramatically in the second half of the 19th century. The first regular steamship route carried passengers, freight and mail to Yokohama in 1867. The transcontinental railroad opened in 1869 and service was expanded to China and the South Pacific. The US Post Office subsidized it to carry the mail. Only one line of steamers connected the U.S. to Japan in 1885, but by 1898 there were six. The trip to Yokohama took 22 days in 1886, and only 12 days in 1898, In the rates for passenger and freight continued to fall.

Missionaries in China

British Protestant churches took the lead in establishing a missionary role in China, especially with the China Inland Mission. The American program was smaller, but it had a certain impact on China, and even more so on the United States.

Local government officials, all steeped in Confucianism, took a hostile view of Christianity, so converts were few and from the social fringe. Much more important was the impact on medicine and education. Peter Parker (1804–1888) in Canton (Guangzhou) was the most influential American missionary doctor. John Kerr (1824-1901) in 1859 established the Boji Hospital in Canton as one of the most influential hospitals in China. He established a medical school and prepared textbooks and journal articles to introduce Western medicine in depth. By 1937, British and American missionaries operated 300 church hospitals, with 21,000 beds, as well as 600 small clinics. The American missionary community could boast of hundreds of primary and secondary schools, topped off by 13 Protestant and three Catholic universities. The capstones were Yenching University and Peking Union Medical College.

American missionaries had an audience at home who listen closely to their first-hand accounts. Around 1900 there were on average about 300 China missionaries on furlough back home, and they presented their case to church groups perhaps 30,000 times a year, reaching several million churchgoers. They were suffused with optimism that sooner or later China would be converted to Christianity. By the 1920s, however, the mainline Protestant churches realize that conversions were not happening, despite all the schools and hospitals. Furthermore, they had come to appreciate the ethical and cultural values of a different civilization, and began to doubt their own superiority. The mainline Protestant denomination missionary work declined rapidly. In their place came a growing role for Chinese Christians. Furthermore, there was an influx of fundamentalist, Pentecostal and Jehovah Witness missionaries who remained committed to the conversion process.

Novelist Pearl S. Buck (1892–1973) was raised in a bilingual environment in China by her missionary parents. China was the setting for many of her best-selling novels and stories, which explored the hardships, and the depth of humanity of the people she loved, and considered fully equal. After college in the United States, she returned to China as a Presbyterian missionary 1914 to 1932. She taught English at the college level. The Good Earth (1931) was her best-selling novel, and a popular movie. Along with numerous other books and articles she reached a large middle-class American audience with a highly sympathetic view of China. The Nobel Prize committee for literature hailed her, "for the notable works which pave the way to a human sympathy passing over widely separated racial boundaries and for the studies of human ideals which are a great and living art of portraiture."

No one had more influence on American political thinking about foreign policy than Henry R. Luce (1898-1967), founder and publisher of Time, Life and Fortune magazines from the 1920s to his death. He was born to missionary parents in China, and educated there until age 15. His Chinese experience made a deep impression, and his publications always gave large scale favorable attention to China. He gave some very strong support to Chiang Kai-shek in his battles against Mao Zedong.

The politically most influential returning missionary was Walter Judd (1898-1994) Who served 10 years is a medical missionary in Fujian 1925-1931 and 1934–1938. On his return to Minnesota, he became an articulate spokesman denouncing the Japanese aggression against China, explaining it in terms of Japan's scarcity of raw materials and markets, population pressure, and the disorder and civil war in China. According to biographer Yanli Gao:
Judd was both a Wilsonian moralist and a Jacksonian protectionist, whose efforts were driven by a general Christian understanding of human beings, as well as a missionary complex. As he appealed simultaneously to American national interests and a popular Christian moral conscience, the Judd experience demonstrated that determined courageous advocacy by missionaries did in fact help to shape an American foreign policy needing to be awakened from its isolationist slumbers." Judd served two decades in Congress 1943-1962 as a Republican, where he was a highly influential spokesman on Asian affairs generally and especially China. He was a liberal missionary and a but a conservative anti-Communist congressman who defined the extent of American support for the Chiang Kai-shek regime.

1905 Chinese boycott 
In response to severe restrictions on Chinese immigration to the United States, the overseas Chinese living in the United States organized a boycott whereby people in China refuse to purchase American products. The project was organized by a reform organization based in the United States, Baohuang Hui. Unlike the reactionary Boxers, these reformers were modernizers. The Manchu government had supported the Boxers, but these reformers—of whom Sun Yat-sen was representative, opposed the government. The boycott was put into effect by merchants and students in south and central China. It made only a small economic impact, because China bought few American products apart from Standard Oil's kerosene. Washington was outraged and treated the boycott as a Boxer-like violent attack, and demanded the Peking government stop it or else. President Theodore Roosevelt asked Congress for special funding for a naval expedition. Washington refused to consider softening the exclusion laws because it responded to deep-seated anti-Chinese prejudices that were widespread especially on the West Coast. It now began to denounce Chinese nationalism. The impact on the Chinese people, in China and abroad, was far-reaching. Jane Larson argues the boycott, "marked the beginning of mass politics and modern nationalism in China. Never before had shared nationalistic aspirations mobilized Chinese across the world in political action, joining the cause of Chinese migrants with the fate of the Chinese nation."

Art collecting
Americans first took notice of Chinese art in the late 18th century, and Japanese art a century later. Wealthy merchants used trading voyages to purchase items, and by the 1850s numerous collectors were active.

Asian students in the United States
Japan and China were sent thousands of students to study in the United States. As part of the Self-Strengthening Movement, the Qing government sent 120 students to New England to live and study for a decade, 1872–1882. However, far more students attended the missionary schools, which had a greater impact on their thinking. Furthermore, for every hundred Chinese students in the United States there were a thousand in Japan, which was closer, cheaper, and the language overlapped Chinese. Chinese students comprised a critical mass, organized themselves and were increasingly committed to a revolution in China. Sun Yat-sen actively recruited them, but Chinese diplomats in Japan tried to support the more conservative students and suppress the revolutionary impulses.

Dollar diplomacy

Dollar diplomacy was the policy of the Taft administration which wanted to minimize the use or threat of military force and instead use American banking power to create a tangible American interest in China that would limit the scope of the other powers, increase the opportunity for American trade and investment, and help maintain the Open Door of trading opportunities of all nations. In his Annual Message to Congress on December 3, 1912, Taft summarized the basic idea:
The diplomacy of the present administration has sought to respond to modern ideas of commercial intercourse. This policy has been characterized as substituting dollars for bullets. It is one that appeals alike to idealistic humanitarian sentiments, to the dictates of sound policy and strategy, and to legitimate commercial aims. 
Whereas Theodore Roosevelt wanted to conciliate Japan and help it neutralize Russia, Taft and his Secretary of State Philander Knox ignored Roosevelt's policy and his advice. Dollar diplomacy was based on the false assumption that American financial interests could mobilize their potential power, and wanted to do so in East Asia. However the American financial system was not geared to handle international finance, such as loans and large investments, and had to depend primarily on London. The British also wanted an open door in China, but were not prepared to support American financial maneuvers. Finally, the other powers held territorial interests, including naval bases and designated geographical areas which they dominated inside China, while the United States refused anything of the kind. Bankers were reluctant, but Taft and Knox kept pushing them to invest. Most efforts were failures, until finally the United States forced its way into the Hukuang international railway loan. The loan was finally made by the so-called China Consortium in 1911, and helped spark a widespread "Railway Protection Movement" revolt against foreign investment that overthrew the Chinese government. The bonds caused no end of disappointment and trouble. As late as 1983, over 300 American investors tried, unsuccessfully, to force the government of China to redeem the worthless Hukuang bonds. When Woodrow Wilson became president in March 1913, he immediately canceled all support for Dollar diplomacy. Historians agree that Taft's Dollar diplomacy was a failure everywhere, In the Far East it alienated Japan and Russia, and created a deep suspicion among the other powers hostile to American motives.

Immigration

Asian immigration to US came in three phases. From 1850 to 1880 about 165,000 Chinese arrived, brought in to build railroads; most returned to China, and because few Chinese women arrived, the numbers of Chinese-Americans shrank. hostility was strong, with numerous violent attacks. As a result, most Chinese-Americans moved to ghettos called Chinatowns in larger cities. the Chinese Exclusion Act of 1882 drastically reduced immigration of unskilled laborers, but students and businessmen were allowed

Large numbers of Japanese farmers went to Hawaii in the 1890s before it became part of the United States. In 1900–10, Japanese farm workers arrived in California and the West Coast. Public opinion in the West was quite hostile to the Chinese and Japanese, and numerous laws were passed that tried to stop or slow the inflow. After 1965 racial quotas were ended, and large numbers of Asians began arriving.

Restrictions

The main legal restriction was the Chinese Exclusion Act, which largely prohibited the immigration of unskilled Chinese from 1882 to 1943. What did occur was largely illegal, especially claiming falsely to have been born in the United States. About 80 to 90 percent were men who left their wives and families behind in China and never saw them again, but they did send remittances.

Japan was too powerful and prideful a nation after defeated Russian 1905 to tolerate legal restrictions. However president Theodore Roosevelt did make the Gentlemen's Agreement of 1907 such that the Japanese would not allow unskilled immigration to the United States. In the 1924 law immigration from Asia was almost completely stopped, except for allowing people who had been born in the United States.

Postwar immigration

World War II-era legislation and judicial rulings gradually increased the ability of Asian Americans to immigrate and become naturalized citizens. By 1960 there were 200,000 Filipino Americans; they numbered 2 million by 2000. The Communist takeovers in East Asia led to waves of refugees from conflicts occurring in Southeast Asia such as the Vietnam War. Korean Americans came as war brides and orphans and many other roles, totalling about 800,000 by 1990. Asian American immigrants have a significant percentage of well-educated individuals who have already achieved professional status, a first among immigration groups.

The most important factor was the Immigration and Nationality Act Amendments of 1965 which ended the main restrictions and quotas on Asians. The total grew by a multiple of 26 from 491,000 in 1960 to 12.8 million in 2014. Asian Americans were the fastest-growing racial group between 2000 and 2010. By 2012, more immigrants came from Asia than from Latin America. In 2015, Pew Research Center found that from 2010 to 2015 more immigrants came from Asia than from Latin America, and that since 1965 Asians have made up a quarter of all immigrants.

Asians have made up an increasing proportion of the foreign-born Americans: "In 1960, Asians represented 5 percent of the U.S. foreign-born population; by 2014, their share grew to 30 percent of the nation's 42.4 million immigrants." As of 2016, "Asia is the second-largest region of birth (after Latin America) of U.S. immigrants." In 2013, China surpassed Mexico as the top single country of origin for immigrants to the U.S. Asian immigrants "are more likely than the overall foreign-born population to be naturalized citizens"; in 2014, 59% of Asian immigrants had U.S. citizenship, compared to 47% of all immigrants. Postwar Asian immigration to the U.S. has been diverse: in 2014, 31% of Asian immigrants to the U.S. were from East Asia (predominately China and Korea); 27.7% were from South Asia (predominately India); 32.6% were from Southeastern Asia (predominately the Philippines and Vietnam) and 8.3% were from Western Asia.

Increasingly Asian American students demanded university-level research and teaching into Asian history and the interaction with the United States. 
They supported multiculturalism but opposed affirmative action that amounted to an Asian quota on their admission.

Cultural transmission

Cuisine
Asian immigrants to the U.S. brought along distinctive cuisines. Chinese, Japanese, Thai and Korean cuisines, for example, have become widely popular. There are several different Chinese cuisines that have become popular, such as Szechwan-Hunan, Fukien, and Yunnan. The preparation and presentation of rice, fish, and fresh produce to this diet is emphasized. In return American fast food restaurants have become popular in Asia. McDonald's opened its first outlet in Japan in 1971, Hong Kong in 1975, Singapore in 1979, Philippines in 1981, Malaysia in 1982, Taiwan in 1984, Thailand in 1985, South Korea in 1988, China in 1990, and Indonesia in 1999, Typically the corporation owns at least 50% of each franchise and local entrepreneurs the rest.

See also
 Journal of American-East Asian Relations, a scholarly journal
 Northeast Asia

U.S.
 Foreign relations of the United States
 History of Asian Americans, a chronology and guide to articles
 Asian Americans
 Asian American immigration history
 Asian American political history
 Military history of Asian Americans
 Chinese American history
 Cambodian American history
 Filipino American history
 Immigration history of Hmong Americans
 Indian American history
 Japanese American history
 Korean American history
 Vietnamese American history

China
China containment policy
China Lobby
Chinese Americans
Chinese Century
Chinese espionage in the United States
China-United States trade war
Taiwan–United States relations
U.S.–China Strategic and Economic Dialogue

Japan
 Japan–United States relations

Notes

Further reading
 Bailey, Thomas A.  A Diplomatic History Of The America People (9th ed. 1974) online 
 Betts, Richard K. "Wealth, power, and instability: East Asia and the United States after the Cold War". International Security 18.3 (1993): 34–77. online
 Burns, Richard Dean, and Edward Moore Bennett, eds. Diplomats in crisis: United States-Chinese-Japanese relations, 1919-1941 (1974) short articles by scholars from all three countries. online 
 Church, Peter. A short history of South-East Asia (John Wiley & Sons, 2017).
 Clyde, Paul H., and Burton F. Beers. The Far East: A History of Western Impacts and Eastern Responses, 1830-1975 (1975) online 3rd edition 1958
 Cohen, Warren I. ed. Pacific Passage: The Study of American–East Asian Relations on the Eve of the Twenty-First Century (Columbia UP, 1996) 13 experts cover the historiography; online
 Cooper, Timothy S. "Anglo-Saxons and Orientals: British-American interaction over East Asia, 1898-1914". (PhD dissertation U of Edinburgh, 2017). online
 Dennett, Tyler. Americans in Eastern Asia (1922) online free
 Ebrey, Patricia Buckley, and Anne Walthall. East Asia: A cultural, social, and political history (Cengage Learning, 2013). online
 Flynn, Matthew J. China Contested: Western Powers in East Asia (2006), for secondary schools
 Green, Michael J. By more than providence: grand strategy and American power in the Asia Pacific since 1783 (2017) a major scholarly survey excerpt
 Hall, D.G.E. History of South East Asia (Macmillan International Higher Education, 1981). online 1955 edition
 Holcombe, Charles. A History of East Asia (2d ed. Cambridge UP, 2017). excerpt
 Iriye, Akira. Across the Pacific : an inner history of American-East Asian relations (1967) online
 Isaacs, Harold R. Scratches on Our Minds: American Images of China and India (1958) online
 Jensen, Richard, Jon Davidann, and Yoneyuki Sugita, eds. Trans-Pacific Relations: America, Europe, and Asia in the Twentieth Century (Praeger, 2003), 304 pp online review
 Kurashige, Lon, ed. Pacific America: Histories of Transoceanic Crossings (2017) excerpt
 Mackerras, Colin. Eastern Asia: An Introductory History (Melbourne: Longman Cheshire, 1992).
 Macnair, Harley F. & Donald Lach. Modern Far Eastern International Relations (2nd ed 1955) 1950 edition online free, 780pp; focus on 1900-1950
 Matray, James I. ed. East Asia and the United States: An Encyclopedia of relations since 1784 (2 vol. Greenwood, 2002). excerpt v 2
 May, Ernest R.; Thomson, James C., Jr., eds.  American-East Asian Relations: A Survey (Harvard UP, 1972) online
 Miller, David Y. Modern East Asia: An Introductory History (Routledge, 2007) 
 Pletcher, David M. The Diplomacy of Involvement: American Economic Expansion Across the Pacific, 1784-1900 (2001).
 Ricklefs, Merle C. A History of Modern Indonesia: c. 1300 to the Present (Macmillan, 1981).
 Raghavan, Srinath. Fierce Enigmas: A History of the United States in South Asia (2018) excerpt
 Shewmaker, Kenneth E. "Forging the 'Great Chain': Daniel Webster and the Origins of American Foreign Policy toward East Asia and the Pacific, 1841-1852". Proceedings of the American Philosophical Society 129.3 (1985): 225–259. online
 Thomson, James et al. Sentimental Imperialists - The American Experience in East Asia (1981) scholarly history over 200 years.
 Thorne, Christopher G. The limits of foreign policy; the West, the League, and the Far Eastern crisis of 1931-1933 (1972) online
 Tyrrell, Ian. "Looking eastward: Pacific and global perspectives on American history in the nineteenth and early twentieth centuries". Japanese Journal of American Studies 18 (2007): 41–57. online
 Van Alstyne, Richard W. The United states and East Asia (1973) short survey by scholar
 Zabriskie, E.H. American-Russian Rivalry in the Far East: A Study in Diplomacy and Power Politics, 1895-1914 (1946) online

China
 Chang, Gordon H. Fateful Ties: A History of America's Preoccupation with China. (Harvard UP, 2015). Excerpt
 Chang, Gordon H. Friends and Enemies: The United States, China, and the Soviet Union, 1948–1972 (Stanford UP, 1990).
 Christensen, Thomas J. In the eyes of the dragon: China views the world (Rowman & Littlefield, 1999).
 Chung, Jae Ho. "The Rise of China and East Asia: A New Regional Order on the Horizon?". Chinese Political Science Review 1.1 (2016): 47–59. online
 Cohen, Warren I. America's Response to China: A History of Sino-American Relations (5th ed. 2010)
 Dulles, Foster Rhea. China and America: The Story of Their Relations Since 1784 (1981), general survey; online 
 Dulles, Foster Rhea. American policy toward Communist China, 1949-1969 (1972) online 
 Fairbank, John K. China Perceived (1974)
 Feis, Herbert. The China Tangle (1967), diplomacy during World War II online 
 Fenby, Jonathan and Trey McArver. The Eagle and the Dragon: Donald Trump, Xi Jinping and the Fate of US/China Relations (2019)

 Foot, Rosemary. The Practice of Power: US Relations with China since 1949 (1995).
 Gedalecia, David. "Letters From the Middle Kingdom: The Origins of America's China Policy", Prologue, 34.4 (Winter, 2002), pp. 260–73.
 Goldstein, Jonathan et al. eds.  America Views China: American Images of China Then and Now ( Lehigh Univ Press) 14 topical essays by scholars.
 Haddad, John R. America's First Adventure in China: Trade, Treaties, Opium, and Salvation (2013) covers 1784 to 1868. 
 Hunt, Michael H. The Making of a Special Relationship: The United States and China to 1914 (1983), A standard scholarly history
 Jespersen, T. Christopher. American Images of China, 1931-1949 (1999) excerpt
 Johnson, Kendall A. The New Middle Kingdom: China and the Early American Romance of Free Trade (Johns Hopkins UP, 2017).
 Latourette, Kenneth Scott. The history of early relations between the United States and China, 1784–1844 (1917) online
 Li, Jing. China's America: The Chinese View the United States, 1900–2000. (State University of New York Press, 2011)
 McLean, David. "American nationalism, the China myth, and the Truman doctrine: The question of accommodation with Peking, 1949–50". Diplomatic History 10.1 (1986): 25-42.
 MacMillan, Margaret. Nixon and Mao: the week that changed the world (2008).
 Madsen, Richard. China and the American Dream (1994)
 Mann, James. About Face: A History of America's Curious Relationship with China, from Nixon to Clinton (2000).
 Mitter, Rana. Forgotten Ally: China's World War II, 1937–1945 (2013) excerpt
 Oksenberg, Michel and Robert B. Oxnam, eds. Dragon and Eagle (1978),
 Pomfret, John. The Beautiful Country and the Middle Kingdom: America and China, 1776 to the Present (2016) review
 Purifoy, Lewis M. Harry Truman's China policy: McCarthyism and the diplomacy of hysteria, 1947-1951 (New Viewpoints, 1976).
 Riccards, Michael P. The Presidency and the Middle Kingdom (2000)
 Rose, Robert S. et al. Re-examining the Cold War: U.S.-China Diplomacy, 1954–1973 (2002)
 Schaller, Michael. "FDR and the 'China Question in FDR's World (Palgrave Macmillan, 2008) pp. 145–174.
 Schaller, Michael. The U.S. Crusade in China, 1938-1945 (1979)
 Song, Yuwu, ed. Encyclopedia of Chinese-American Relations (McFarland, 2006)
 Sutter, Robert G. U.S.-Chinese Relations: Perilous Past, Pragmatic Present (2010).
 Sutter, Robert G. Historical Dictionary of United States-China Relations (2005).
 Varg, Paul A. "Sino‐American Relations Past and Present". Diplomatic History 4.2 (1980): 101–112. online
 Vevier, Charles. "The Open Door: An Idea in Action, 1906-1913". Pacific Historical Review 24.1 (1955): 49–62. online
 Vogelmann, Jörg. The ascent of China as a new superpower and the relationship with the hegemonic United States: Rough power politics or peaceful economic cooperation?(GRIN Verlag, 2008).
 Wang, Dong. The United States and China: A History from the Eighteenth Century to the Present (2013)
Wang, Dong. "Grand Strategy, Power Politics, and China's Policy toward the United States in the 1960s", Diplomatic History 42:1 (April 2017): 265–287; 
Westad, Odd Arne, "The Sources of Chinese Conduct: Are Washington and Beijing Fighting a New Cold War?", Foreign Affairs, vol. 98, no. 5 (September / October 2019), pp. 86–95.

Zhang, Biwu. Chinese Perceptions of the U.S.: An Exploration of China's Foreign Policy Motivations (Lexington Books; 2012) 266 pages.

Japan
 Asada, Sadao. From Mahan to Pearl Harbor: The Imperial Japanese Navy and the United States (Naval Institute Press, 2013).
Dahl, Elizabeth. "The Implications of Japan Bashing for US-Japan Relations". Swords & Plowshares: A Journal of International Relations (1999).
 Davidann, Jon. Cultural diplomacy in US-Japanese relations, 1919-1941 (Springer, 2007).
 Dian, Matteo. The Evolution of the US-Japan Alliance: the eagle and the chrysanthemum (Chandos Publishing, 2014).
 Dulles, Foster Rhea. Yankees and Samurai: America's Role in the Emergence of Modern Japan, 1791–1900 (1965)
 Harris, Townsend, The complete journal of Townsend Harris, first American consul general and minister to Japan (1930) online free' primary source
 Hook, Glenn D. et al. Japan's International Relations: Politics, Economics and Security (2011) excerpt
 Johnson, Sheila K. American attitudes toward Japan, 1941-1975 (1975) online 
 LaFeber, Walter. The Clash: A History of US–Japan Relations (W.W. Norton, 1997)
 Nimmo, William F. Stars and Stripes Across the Pacific: The United States, Japan, and Asia/Pacific Region, 1895-1945 (Greenwood, 2001). excerpt

Historiography
 Aruga, Natsuki, "Viewing American History from Japan" in 
 Cohen, Warren I. "The History of American-East Asian Relations: Cutting Edge of the Historical Profession". Diplomatic History. (1985) 9#2: 101–112.  
 Cohen, Warren I. ed. Pacific Passage: The Study of American–East Asian Relations on the Eve of the Twenty-First Century (Columbia UP, 1996) 13 experts cover the historiography
 Dower, John. 'Occupied Japan as History and Occupation History as Politics", Journal of Asian Studies (1975) 34#2 485–504.
 Hall, John Whitney. Japanese History: New Dimensions of Approach and Understanding (1961) online.
 Pederson, William D. ed. A Companion to Franklin D. Roosevelt (2011) online FDR and China & India pp. 590–611; on Japan pp. 612–35.
 Reischauer, Edwin. My Life Between Japan And America (1986). online
 Ricard, Serge, ed. A Companion to Theodore Roosevelt (2011) and Japan, pp 368–416 online
 Roberts, Priscilla. "New Perspectives on Cold War History from China", Diplomatic History 41:2 (April 2017) online
 Xia, Yafeng and Zhi Liang. "China's Diplomacy toward the United States in the Twentieth Century: A Survey of the Literature", Diplomatic History 42:1 (April 2017): 241–264.

External links
 Guide to Countries, Office of the Historian, U.S. Department of State

Foreign relations of the United States